Thérèse Soukar Chehade is an American author. Her first book Loom: a Novel, published in 2010 by Syracuse University Press, won the 2011 Arab American Book Award. Soukar Chehade lives in western Massachusetts, where she writes and teaches English.

Early life and education
Thérèse Soukar Chehade was born and raised in Beirut, Lebanon. When she was 12 years old, the civil war broke out, and "for the next eight years, she toggled between living the life of an ordinary teenager and hiding from bullets and bombs". In 1983, she moved from Lebanon to Massachusetts. There she enrolled at the University of Massachusetts Amherst, where she obtained a Master of Fine Arts in English writing, studying with John Edgar Wideman, as well as a master's degree in English language education.

Writing influences
Soukar Chehade's writing centers around the civilian experience of living in a war zone, fleeing from war, and having to start a new life from scratch in a new place. She credits Virginia Woolf's "To the Lighthouse" with inspiring her to write in her non-native English.

Loom: A Novel

Synopsis 
Chehade's first novel, "Loom", portrays a Lebanese-American family, the Zaydans, struggling to reconcile generational differences and immigrant identity. On the evening of the arrival of a cousin, Eva, from Lebanon, the Zaydans are sequestered by a blizzard. Amidst the storm, the family matriarch Emilie struggles with English and prefers not to speak. Her eldest daughter, Josephine, still lives at home with her brother George's family and remembers the independence she had in Lebanon. George's daughter, Marie, longs to leave behind her conservative family and head off to Berkeley. With Eva stranded in the storm in New York, and tensions rising, Emilie braves the blizzard to deliver a meal to the mysterious neighbor the Zaydans have nicknamed "Loom", and the family is forced to leave the metaphorical and actual isolation of their home as they go after her.

Influences 
In the novel, Chehade draws heavily from her experiences growing up during the Lebanese Civil War as well as from her life as a young immigrant in New England. Her memories of the war helped to inform the character development of Eva and Salma.

Reception 
On release, Loom was recommended by Library Journal magazine, as part of its "Fall Firsts" purchase list. In Foreword Reviews, Jessica Henkle described the book as an entire story formed within a pause where what ensues over twenty-four hours is spellbinding, revealing a history of secrets and resentments, of undisclosed pain and unshakeable love. Theri Alyce Pickens thought the book was a hauntingly beautiful read, where as the snow falls, the novel’s pace slows considerably to give room to the characters’ musings, but where this slowness is compensated for by Chehade’s outstanding skill in developing their memories, painting each with depth and sadness without making them tragic or depressing.

Awards 
2011 Arab American Book Award for Loom: a Novel

Bibliography

Fiction
 Loom: A Novel, Syracuse University Press, Syracuse, NY, 2010.
 Red Pistachios, Big Big Wednesday, Issue 5, 2017.
 ''Madame Latte, Taos Journal of International Poetry and Art, 2017.

Newspaper columns
 An immigrant reflects after the election, Daily Hampshire Gazette, November 22, 2016.
 Return to an obtuse and dangerous innocence, Daily Hampshire Gazette, January 5, 2017.
 Borders are complicated spaces, Daily Hampshire Gazette, February 5, 2017.
 Drive for independence pulses like a heartbeat, Daily Hampshire Gazette, July 3, 2018.

References

External links
Thérèse Soukar Chehade SheWrites.com Profile
Thérèse Chehade GoodReads.com Author Profile
Loom Publisher's Book Page

Year of birth missing (living people)
Living people
21st-century American women writers
21st-century American novelists
Novelists from Massachusetts
Writers from Massachusetts
American women novelists
Lebanese
People from Granby, Massachusetts
Lebanese emigrants to the United States
University of Massachusetts Amherst alumni